The Yale Journal on Regulation (JREG) is a biannual student-edited law review covering regulatory and administrative law published at Yale Law School. The journal publishes articles, essays, notes, and commentaries that cover a wide range of topics in regulatory, corporate, administrative, international, and comparative law. According to the 2015 Washington and Lee University law journal rankings, the journal is ranked first in Administrative Law, in Corporations and Associations, in Commercial Law, in Communications Law, Media and Journalism, and in Health, Medicine, Psychology and Psychiatry. The 2007 ExpressO Guide to Top Law Reviews ranked the journal first among business law reviews based on the number of manuscripts received.

History
The journal was established in 1983 by Mark Goldberg and Bruce Judson. It has featured symposia and special issues on environmental law, federalism, and telecommunications. In 2009, it was a sponsor of the Weil, Gotshal & Manges Roundtable on the "Future of Financial Regulation," where legal academics and panelists evaluated the causes of the subprime mortgage crisis and proposed solutions.

In 2008, the journal launched the Walton H. Hamilton Prize (in honor of the former Yale Law professor, New Deal economic advisor, and antitrust division official Walton Hale Hamilton), awarded to the most outstanding accepted manuscript on the study and understanding of regulatory policy.

Notable alumni 
Alok Ahuja – Judge, Missouri Court of Appeals
Alena Allen – Dean (designate) of Louisiana State University School of Law
Boris Bershteyn – Acting Administrator of the Office of Information and Regulatory Affairs
Sergio Campos – Professor of Law at University of Miami School of Law
Daniel C. Esty – Commissioner of the Connecticut Department of Energy and Environmental Protection and professor at Yale Law School
Elizabeth Esty – U.S. Representative for Connecticut's 5th congressional district
 Dabney Friedrich – United States district judge for the District of Columbia
 Jack Goldsmith – Henry L. Shattuck Professor of Law at Harvard Law School; Co-Founder of Lawfare Blog
Diane Gujarati – United States district judge of the United States District Court for the Eastern District of New York
Daniel Hemel – Professor of Law at NYU Law School
Robert Hockett – Professor of Law at Cornell University Law School
 David Huebner – United States Ambassador to New Zealand and Samoa
Bruce Judson – author and media innovator
Robin Kelsey – Professor of Photography and Dean of Arts and Humanities at Harvard University 
Lina Khan – Chairperson of the Federal Trade Commission
 Claire Priest – Professor of Law at Yale Law School
Alex Raskolnikov – Professor of Tax Law at Columbia University Law School
Gabriel Rauterberg – Professor of Law at University of Michigan Law School
Adriana Robertson  – Donald N. Pritzker Professor of Business Law at the University of Chicago Law School
Gene Schaerr – Associate Counsel to President George Bush
 Richard J. Sullivan – United States circuit judge for the United States Court of Appeals for the Second Circuit
 Bryan Townsend – Delaware State Senator
 Kevin K. Washburn – Dean of University of Iowa College of Law; Former Assistant Secretary, Bureau of Indian Affairs

References

External links

 Notice and Comment Blog
 Yale Law School, "Corporate Law Center Celebrates 10th Anniversary With Financial Regulation Roundtable Feb. 13"

American law journals
Yale Law School
English-language journals
Biannual journals
Publications established in 1983
Law journals edited by students
Administrative law journals